Leucoptera sphenograpta is a moth in the Lyonetiidae family. It is found in India (Uttar Pradesh).

Biology
This species has a wingspan of 6-7mm. It completes 10 to 12 generations in a year and its host plant is Dalbergia sissoo (Indian rosewood) (Fabaceae) but has also become a pest on Poplar.

See also 
 Leucoptera (moth)

References

Leucoptera (moth)
Moths described in 1911
Moths of Asia